Sima is a town located on the island of Anjouan in the Comoros.

It has an estimated population of 11,000. 

Populated places in Anjouan